Yacht people is a slang term for the wealthy residents of Hong Kong who fled the city in the 1980s and 1990s, prior to the city's return to Chinese rule in 1997. The term is a deliberate contrast to the poor "boat people" who fled southeast Asia (most notably Vietnam) in the 1970s. One of the destinations for the yacht people was Vancouver, British Columbia, Canada.

This term has also been used for rich Kuwaiti who fled their country upon the Iraqi invasion.

Yachties
Yacht people should not be confused with people that live aboard their yachts in foreign countries.  These people tend to be ex-pats who arrive aboard their own yacht, usually a sailboat and stay extended periods in countries like Thailand, Mexico, and Indonesia. Many live full-time aboard their vessels and only return home for holidays. Some yachties will spend years in the same port before moving on or returning to their home countries.

"Last port" is a phrase used by yachties to refer to a location where a high percentage of yachts never leave the destination or the yacht is sold after arriving. These ports tend to be in areas where physically it is difficult to sail home, the cost of living is low, and parts to repair vessels expensive to obtain.

See also
 Emigration from Hong Kong

References

Human migration
History of Hong Kong